
This is a list of Jewish-American mobsters and organized crime figures, ranging from the late 19th century to the present day.

See also
 List of mobsters by city

References

Further reading
 Block, Alan A. Lepke, Kid Twist, and the Combination: Organized Crime in New York City, 1930–1944. 1976.
 Cohan, Hillary. Growing Up Jewish In The Mob. 2013. 
 Sadowsky, Sandy. Wedded to Crime: My Life in the Jewish Mafia. 1992.

External links
 New Voices: Left Off the Ark—A Bestiary of Gangs

 
Mobsters
Jewish American mobsters
Jew